Emmanuel de Aranda (Bruges, 1612 or 1614 - there, c. 1686) (also Manuel) was a Southern Netherlands traveler, historian and poet. He lived for two years as a Barbary slave and wrote a famous book about his experiences.

Biography

Early life and education 
Aranda was a descendant of a family that came from Valladolid in Spain and had settled in Bruges for several generations. They were mainly active in the textile industry and were of distinguished ranks in Spain. Emmanuel's father, Don Francisco, was a consular. His mother was Anne Van Severen. His oldest brother, Franciscus, married Isabelle Cloribus, had moved to Bruges and became the mayor.

After completing his law studies at the University of Leuven, Aranda was ready to step into the family business. In preparation, he made a trip to Spain. He left in 1639 and was joined by Renier Saldens (a doctor from Oostkamp), the Bruges junior Jan Baptiste Van Caloen and knight Philips de Cerf (or Ducherf, lord of Hondschoote and Leystrate, who later became mayor of Veurne).

Hijacking
The next year, the group returned to County of Flanders. They settled in San Sebastián on an English merchant ship that was hijacked off the coast of Brittany on August 22, 1640, by Barbary pirates under the command of an English turncoat. One day earlier, Aranda's ship was chased by a suspicious caravel, but the naive captain did not try to get away. The carload was supported by two larger ships, which hoisted the Algiers silver green flag of Algeria. The crew of the merchant ship were captured without a fight and taken to a nearby port.

Aranda was taken as a slave to Algeria and was sold there as a slave. He stayed there for a little more than a year (1640-1641) while his exchange was negotiated and could return to Duchy of Brabant in 1642.

Slavery 
In Algeria  captives were led to the palace of the Pasha, who was able to claim one eighth of the prisoners brought in. Aranda and his other companions were sold at the slave market (also known as zoco or bedesten). Grand Admiral Ali Pegelin paid 200 stakes for Aranda.

The frail Arando had to do heavy labor in a flour warehouse. He later described how he almost collapsed. He then became a construction worker at Pegelin's country house and later a house servant.

Release and return
Negotiations for ransom were complicated because prisoners did not want to show that they were rich and had given false names. Finally, Arando and Caldo, his companion, were exchanged against five Muslims who were detained in Flanders. They were released to pick up the Algerians in Dunkirk. He brought them to Ceuta. After an eventful sea voyage, Aranda and Caldo arrived in Tétouan, where they had some memorable moments in the 'matemoren' (overcrowded underground slave dungeons). They could travel on to Ceuta, where the exchange took place and they were received by Spanish Governor Miranda. On March 24, 1642, Aranda made the crossing to Gibraltar from where he traveled by land to Rouen. There, he embarked to Dover, from there to Dunkirk and so on by land until he reached his hometown on August 20, 1642.

Lawyer and writer in Bruges 
Thanks to Francisco de Valcarcel y Velasquez, Aranda was able to work as a military auditor for the quarterly of West Flanders. On December 26, 1644, he married the 18-year-old Catharina van Hauweghem in the Saint Michael's Church in Ghent. They had fourteen children.

He published a report of his experience as Relation de la captivité, et liberté du Sieur Emanuel de Aranda. Later, a didactico-burlesque poetry followed about the seven deadly sins (1679), which was written in the style of Adriaan Poirters.

In the last weeks  of his life, he wrote another work about the Bruges of his time, but he did not get a chance to publish it.

History of Turkish Slavery
Aranda wrote his own story and had it published in French by the Brussels printer Jan Mommaert (1656). It provides a remarkable view for the time. Nevertheless, the Dutch text of the manuscript explains that the 'universal morality' was mainly found in the commercial edition and was continually emphasised throughout successive editions, undoubtedly on the initiative of the publisher. The question even arises whether Aranda himself was the author of the stories, as is claimed in the book. In any case, it was a successful choice because the work found international resonance. English, Dutch and later French editions of the book were published (1671).

In its final form, the work consisted of the following parts:

preliminary work (family history and description of Algieria in antiquity, which he identified with ancient Julia Caesarea);
chronological report of the hijacking until the return to Bruges;
37 moralizing stories.

It is an interesting example of a captivity tale or a slave narrative.

Curiously enough, Aranda does not mention the fact that one of his ancestors had made a spectacular passage in Algieria 63 years earlier. Don Miguel de Aranda from Valencia, a priest from the order of Monlesà, was burned alive on May 15, 1577, at the port of the hijacker's city. That had happened under the eyes of Miguel de Cervantes, who did not fail to mention it in Los baños de Argel.

Publications 
 The Relation of the captivity, the liberté du Sieur Emanuel de Aranda, mené esclave à Alger and l'an 1640 & mass and liberté l'an 1642, Brussels, Jean Mommart, 1656
 History of the Turkish slavery, Described by Emanuel De Airanda, soo hy selfs who has suffered, The Hague, 1657
 Relation de la Captivité du Sieur Emanuel d'Aranda, Paris, 1657
 Relation of captivity and liberté du Sieur Emanuel d'Aranda, jadis esclave à Alger, Brussels, 1662
 The History of Algiers and It's Slavery: With Many Remarkable Particularities of Africk, London, 1666
 Diverses morales et divertissantes du Sr. Emanuel D'aranda, Leiden, 1671
 Turcksche Slaeverny and the Bekomen Vreyheyt by Jor Emanuël de Aranda, Bruges, 1682
 The smiling and learning Waer-seggher, Brussels, Joan de Grieck, 1679

Modern edition
 Latifa Z'rari, Emanuel d'Aranda. Les captifs d'Alger, Paris, J-P. Rocher, 1997

Bibliography
 M. Delvenne, "Emmanuel d'Aranda", in: Biographie du royaume des Pays-Bas, Liège, Veuve Desoer, 1829
 P. Blommaert, "Belgian travelers. I. Emmanuel de Aranda" in: Kunst- en Letterblad, 1840
 Baron Jules de Saint-Genois, Les Voyageurs belges, Jamar, Brussels, 1846
 Baron De Reiffenberg, Bulletins de l'Academie de Bruxelles, part XIII, vol. I, 1846
O. Delepierre, "Emmanuel de Aranda], in: Biographie des hommes remarquables de la Flandre Occidentale, Bruges, 1847
 F. Van Dycke, Recueil héraldique de nobles and patrician families de la ville and the franconat de Bruges, Bruges, 1851
 Jules De Saint Genois, Emmanuel de Aranda, in: Biographie nationale de Belgique, vol. I, Brussels, 1866, col. 357-362
 M. Luwel, "Emmanuel de Aranda and Algiers of the 17th century", in: Announcements from the Marine Academy of Belgium, 1960
 André Vandewalle, "The Spaniards in Bruges, the most faithful foreign colony", in: Jempie Herreboudt (ed.), The Sint-Franciscus Xaverius hospital. Healthcare in the Spanish quarter in Bruges, Bruges, 1985
 Lexicon of West Flemish writers, Volume 3, Torhout, 1986
 Karel Van Nieuwenhuyse, "The integration of the Castilian family De Aranda in Bruges, 1500–1765", in: Acts of the Society for History, 2000
 Joos Vermeulen, Sultans, slaves and renegades. The hidden history of the Ottoman Empire, Leuven, Acco, 2001
 Lisa Kattenberg, Muslims, "moral deities" and commercial success. The slavery record of Emanuel d'Aranda, 1640–1682, in: The Seventeenth Century. Culture in the Netherlands in an interdisciplinary perspective, vol. 28, No. 1, August 2012, pages 21–39

References

1610s births
1680s deaths
Writers from Bruges
Slavery in Algeria
17th-century Dutch writers
Flemish writers (before 1830)
Slaves from the Ottoman Empire
African slaves
Barbary slave trade
17th-century slaves
17th-century memoirists